Elierce Barbosa de Souza or simply Souza (born 8 March 1988, in Posse) is a Brazilian footballer who plays for Náutico, as a defensive midfielder.

Career
Souza began his career playing for various teams in the Federal District, as Ceilândia, Brasília and Dom Pedro.

He made his first team debut for the former on 25 August 2007 in a 0–1 home loss against Capital and scored his first goal in a 2–0 home win against Renovo.

He faced several difficulties, such as living with hunger, sometimes going to training without breakfast, not having enough to eat. He thought of giving up the dream of being a player and for a time did: he gave up football and returned to Posse, his hometown, to work as a bricklayer. In 2008, he revived the dream of being a football player and went to Dom Pedro II in Brasília. He stood out, and was pointed out by many as the best midfielder of the Brasiliense Championship. He was hired by Palmeiras and spent time in Palmeiras B, then, having stood out again, was promoted by Vanderlei Luxemburgo Palmeiras to the first team.

Career Statistics

Club
.

Honours
Cruzeiro
Campeonato Brasileiro Série A: 2013

Cerezo Osaka
J.League Cup: 2017
Emperor's Cup: 2017

References

External links

 Profile at Cerezo Osaka
 

1988 births
Living people
Brazilian footballers
Sociedade Esportiva Palmeiras players
Associação Atlética Ponte Preta players
Associação Desportiva São Caetano players
Clube Náutico Capibaribe players
Cruzeiro Esporte Clube players
Santos FC players
Esporte Clube Bahia players
Cerezo Osaka players
Ettifaq FC players
Khor Fakkan Sports Club players
J1 League players
J2 League players
Campeonato Brasileiro Série A players
Campeonato Brasileiro Série B players
Saudi Professional League players
UAE Pro League players
Brazilian expatriate footballers
Expatriate footballers in Japan
Expatriate footballers in Saudi Arabia
Expatriate footballers in the United Arab Emirates
Brazilian expatriate sportspeople in Japan
Brazilian expatriate sportspeople in Saudi Arabia
Brazilian expatriate sportspeople in the United Arab Emirates
Association football midfielders
Association football fullbacks